Channel 50 or TV50 may refer to:

 TV50, a series of events in 2012 celebrating the 50th anniversary of RTÉ Television, Ireland

Mexico
The following television stations operate on virtual channel 50 in Mexico:
 XEJ-TDT in Ciudad Juárez, Chihuahua

See also
 Channel 50 virtual TV stations in the United States
For UHF frequencies covering 687.25-691.75 MHz:
 Channel 50 TV stations in Mexico
 Channel 50 digital TV stations in the United States
 Channel 50 low-power TV stations in the United States

50